Isla Gorge is a national park in Queensland, Australia, 415 km northwest of Brisbane, gazetted in 1964.  It contains a rest area with toilets and a camping area, situated along the Leichhardt Highway just south of Theodore.

The national park is upon the traditional Aboriginal lands of the Kongabulla Clan of Iman country, the carpet snake people, and Wulli Wulli country.

The north-western section was expanded in 1990 to include the hand-laid rock road which once ran from Rockhampton to Roma as part of the wool run.

See also

 Protected areas of Queensland

References

National parks of Central Queensland
Protected areas established in 1964